The Claflin-Norrish House is a historic octagonal house located in Hastings, Minnesota, United States; a contributing property to the West Second Street Residential Historic District. The two-story home was built of limestone covered with stucco. Special features include a windowed cupola and wrap-around porch. It still stands at Spring and West 2nd Streets. It is one of scores of eight-sided homes built in the antebellum United States.

Originally built for the Clafflin family, John F. Norris purchased the house in the late 19th century. After the mid-1940s, the house was remodeled into 5 unit apartments. It was bought by John and Lorena Phelps and has been going through renovation to make it a single family house.

References

External links
 City of Hastings Residential Style Guide

Houses completed in 1858
Historic district contributing properties in Minnesota
Houses in Dakota County, Minnesota
Houses on the National Register of Historic Places in Minnesota
Octagon houses in the United States
Buildings and structures in Hastings, Minnesota
National Register of Historic Places in Dakota County, Minnesota